Elkie Brooks (born Elaine Bookbinder; 25 February 1946) is an English rock, blues and jazz singer. She was a vocalist with the bands Dada and Vinegar Joe, and later became a solo artist. She gained her biggest success in the late 1970s and 1980s, releasing 13 UK Top 75 singles, and reached the top ten with "Pearl's a Singer", "Sunshine After the Rain" (both 1977) and "No More the Fool" (1986).  She has been nominated twice for the Brit Awards.

Brooks is a Gold Badge Award of Merit winner from the British Academy of Songwriters, Composers and Authors (BASCA) (now The Ivors Academy) and is generally referred to as the "British Queen of Blues".

Life and career

Early career and Vinegar Joe
Brooks was born Elaine Bookbinder in Salford, to a Jewish family. Her father's grandparents emigrated to Britain from Poland at the start of the 20th century to escape the pogroms. Her older brothers are Raymond Bookbinder (born 1938) and Anthony Bookbinder (born 28 May 1943), who went by the stage name of Tony Mansfield, and was drummer for Billy J. Kramer with the Dakotas on their run of 1960s hit records.

Whilst still a child, Brooks began singing at barmitzvahs and weddings; according to Brooks, her unofficial debut was a gig at a club called the "Laronde" on Cheetham Hill Road, Manchester, when she was 13 years old. Aged 15, she won a talent contest in Manchester, leading to her taking part in a pop package tour which was promoted by Don Arden (whose daughter, Sharon Osbourne, would later be known as a music manager). Her first record, a cover of Etta James's "Something's Got a Hold on Me", was released on Decca in 1964. Brooks spent most of the 1960s on Britain's cabaret scene, a period of her life that she did not particularly enjoy. In the mid 1960s, she supported the Beatles in their Christmas show in London, then, as an established act, helped the Small Faces in their early career by introducing them at several venues. She went on to tour the United States with several bands, including The Animals. She also toured the then communist Poland with Jon Lord's The Artwoods.

In the 1960s, Brooks had begun singing jazz with Humphrey Lyttelton's band, but subsequently changed direction musically. After she met Pete Gage, whom she would marry, she joined the short-lived blues rock fusioneers Dada, before forming Vinegar Joe with Gage and Robert Palmer. Brooks gained the reputation as the wild woman of rock 'n' roll, due to her wild stage performances. After three albums, they split up in 1974, and Brooks and Palmer pursued separate solo careers. After a time as backing singer with the American southern boogie band Wet Willie, she returned to England.

Solo career and chart success

Brooks first solo album, released on A & M Records, was Rich Man's Woman (1975). It was released to critical acclaim, but Brooks was criticised because of the album's cover shot of a naked Brooks with a feather boa, which was considered outrageous for the time.

This came before a run of 16 albums in 20 years, starting with Two Days Away (1977), produced by the songwriting duo Jerry Leiber and Mike Stoller, who had previously worked with Elvis Presley; Brooks also wrote tracks with Leiber and Stoller. The hits "Pearl's a Singer" (reaching No. 8 in the UK Singles Chart) and "Sunshine After the Rain" (which reached No. 10) came from this album. 1977 also saw Brooks duet with Cat Stevens on the song "Remember the Days of the Old Schoolyard" which reached No.33 on the Billboard charts and No.44 in UK. The albums Shooting Star (1978) and Live and Learn (1979) also saw success, along with the singles "Lilac Wine" and "Don't Cry Out Loud". Her polished, powerful cover of Gallagher and Lyle's "The Runaway" saw the Scottish singer-songwriters appear with Brooks on Top of the Pops to provide backing vocals.

In 1980, Brooks performed at the Knebworth Festival with The Beach Boys, Santana and Mike Oldfield. The Pearls album, released in 1981, was the biggest commercial success of her career, charting for 79 weeks and reaching No. 2 in the UK Albums Chart. The album was still in the charts a year later, when Pearls ll (1982) reached No. 5, spending 26 weeks on the charts. The Gus Dudgeon-produced "Fool If You Think It's Over (1981)", written by Chris Rea, was a major hit single for Brooks.  Other chart singles followed, with "Our Love", "Nights in White Satin" and "Gasoline Alley", all produced by Dudgeon. The 1984 albums Minutes and Screen Gems were both chart hits in the same year. In 1986, Brooks sang the title theme song for the BBC television series A Very Peculiar Practice. Written by Dave Greenslade, it was never released commercially.

In early 1987, the song "No More the Fool" reached the top five for Brooks, and became her biggest hit single to date, with the parent album also reaching the top five. This led to her achieving another career peak, with two albums in the top ten and a single in the top ten in the same week. More chart success ensued with the albums The Very Best of Elkie Brooks (1986), Bookbinder's Kid (1988), Inspiration (1989), Round Midnight (1993), Nothin' but the Blues (1994), Amazing (1996) and  The Very Best of Elkie Brooks (1997).

Later work

In March 2003, Brooks participated in the ITV music talent show Reborn in the USA, alongside musicians such as Peter Cox, Tony Hadley and Leee John. The same year, the album Trouble in Mind was released, which saw her collaborate with Humphrey Lyttelton, whom she had worked with earlier in her career, and his Band. The album included "Bad Penny Blues" with added lyrics. The Electric Lady album (2005), produced by her son Jermaine Jordan, saw a return to her blues and rock roots, featuring self-penned tracks alongside re-workings of numbers by the Doors, Bob Dylan, Paul Rodgers and Tony Joe White. The following year saw the release of her first official DVD, Elkie Brooks & Friends: Pearls, featuring an array of guest musicians.

Brooks's twentieth studio album, Powerless, also produced by Jordan, was released in 2010, featuring songs such as Prince's "Purple Rain" and Dylan's "Make You Feel My Love". She continues to perform live throughout the UK and Ireland. In 2012, Brooks released her autobiography Finding My Voice, published by The Robson Press. In it, she detailed her life and career, focusing on her love of performing live and the downsides of the recording business, which she says has often left her financially no better off.

In July 2017, after Brooks signed to Virgin EMI, the album Pearls - The Very Best Of, was released. It charted at No. 14, and included two new singles: "Love Ain't Something that You Can Get for Free" and the Bryan Adams-penned "Forgive and Forget". Later in the year, a remix of the 1979 album track "The Rising Cost of Love" was also released as a single. All three singles made it onto the Radio 2 'A' playlist, with "Forgive and Forget" being the network's "Record of the Week". Brooks promoted the album with several appearances on Radio 2 programmes, including the Aled Jones Show, and The One Show on BBC One. On 19 September that year, Brooks appeared at the London Palladium to mark 40 years since her first sell-out week at the venue in 1977. The show also celebrated her 40 years of success since the release of the single "Pearl's a Singer".

The same year, Brooks recorded the closing theme song for the 2017 film Finding Your Feet, which starred Imelda Staunton, Timothy Spall, Celia Imrie and Joanna Lumley. The track, "Running to the Future", was released as a download-only single, and included on the soundtrack album. Brooks' self-penned song "Just An Excuse" has been remixed several times, most notably appearing on the Bonobo album Migration in 2017. She has performed live since 1960; her 2021 tour, put back from 2020, has been billed as her 60th Year Anniversary Tour.

Personal life
In the early to mid-1970s, Brooks was married to guitarist Pete Gage. On 1 March 1978, she married her sound engineer, Trevor Jordan, who had worked with Diana Ross, Rolling Stones, Pavarotti, Sarah Vaughan and many others.  They live in Devon and have two sons, Jermaine (born 22 December 1979) and Joseph (born 31 December 1986). Between 1981 and 2002, they lived in a mansion in a secluded area of North Devon. However, in 1998, after her accountant informed her that he had not been paying her taxes, Brooks found herself in severe debt and was reduced to living in a mobile home. After four years of increasing interest bills and loans, Brooks managed to sell her home (after being threatened with repossession) and cleared all of her debts. In 2000, Brooks' management and tour promotion was taken over by her son, Jermaine, and his wife, Joanna.

Discography

 Rich Man's Woman (1975)
 Two Days Away (1977)
 Shooting Star (1978)
 Live and Learn (1979)
 Pearls (1981)
 Pearls II (1982)
 Minutes (1984)
 Screen Gems (1984)
 No More the Fool (1986)
 Bookbinder's Kid (1988)
 Inspiration (1989)
 Pearls III (1991)
 Round Midnight (1993)
 Nothin' but the Blues (1994)
 Circles (1995)
 Amazing (1996)
 Shangri-La (2003)
 Trouble in Mind [with Humphrey Lyttelton] (2003)
 Electric Lady (2005)
 Powerless  (2009)

Awards
The Ivors Academy
Formerly British Academy of Songwriters, Composers and Authors  BASCA.

Songfestival van Knokke / European Song Cup 

(Music contest in the Belgium,  1959-1973).

Capital Radio Music Awards 1979

Melody Maker British Music Magazine. 

Disc Music Poll Awards 1974

Disc was a British music magazine between 1958 and 1975, when it merged with Record Mirror.

Ny Musik Svensk Musiktidning 

(Music magazine that circulated in Sweden, Norway, Denmark and Finland).

The British Rock & Pop Awards 

Organised jointly by the Daily Mirror, (Associated Television 1976/77), BBC Radio 1 and BBC TV's Nationwide (TV programme) 1978/84.

Guinness Book of British Hit Albums

Record Mirror Year End Charts

Music Week Awards -  
Chart Performance Survey

British Phonographic Industry certifications:

References

External links
Official website of Elkie Brooks

1946 births
English women singers
English soul singers
Living people
People from Salford
People from Prestwich
Music in Salford
Musicians from Manchester
British rhythm and blues boom musicians
Island Records artists
Jewish British musicians
English Jews
English people of Polish-Jewish descent
English blues singers
English jazz singers
A&M Records artists